Matthias James Regis "Pep" Kelly (January 9, 1914 in North Bay, Ontario — August 22, 1990) was a professional ice hockey player who played 288 games in the National Hockey League with the Toronto Maple Leafs, Chicago Black Hawks, and Brooklyn Americans between 1934 and 1942.

Career statistics

Regular season and playoffs

External links

1914 births
1990 deaths
Brooklyn Americans players
Buffalo Bisons (AHL) players
Canadian ice hockey right wingers
Chicago Blackhawks players
Ice hockey people from Ontario
Pittsburgh Hornets players
Providence Reds players
Sportspeople from North Bay, Ontario
Springfield Indians players
Syracuse Stars (IHL) players
Toronto Maple Leafs players
Toronto St. Michael's Majors players